SXU may refer to:

Saint Xavier University in Chicago, Illinois
Shanxi University in Shanxi Province, China
Simple X Unlocked
Synergistic eXecution Unit

sxu is the ISO 639 language code for Upper Saxon German.